Kerrie Mengersen  (born 1962) is an Australian statistician. Since 2016, she has been Distinguished Professor of Statistics at Queensland University of Technology in the Science and Engineering Faculty.

She earned BA (Hons I) and PhD degrees in Mathematics, majoring in Statistics and Computing, from the University of New England (Armidale, New South Wales, Australia) in 1985 and 1989, respectively.  She is the Director of the Bayesian Research and Applications Group (BRAG). This group is part of the Australian Research Council (ARC) Centre of Excellence for Mathematical and Statistical Frontiers (ACEMS) of Big Data, Big Models, New Insights.

She has co-authored three books and edited two, and has written 27 book chapters and approximately 250 journal articles. Her research cuts across a broad spectrum of statistical practice. She is primarily known for her work in Bayesian statistics and meta-analysis, and has worked in applications of statistics in medicine and environmental science. In 2016, she was the first woman to be awarded the Statistical Society of Australia's Pitman Medal, which recognises outstanding achievement in the statistics discipline. She talks about new challenges for statisticians in a YouTube video. She has contributed to Australian biosecurity efforts.
In October 2015 her research in building virtual habitats was highlighted on the ABC.

Mengersen was the National President of the Statistical Society of Australia (SSAI) in 2013, and was the International President of the International Society for Bayesian Analysis (ISBA) in 2016. As of 2022 she is a member of the Academy Council of the Queensland Academy of Arts and Sciences.

Publications

Honours and awards
 2014 Elected Fellow of the International Society for Bayesian Analysis
 Elected Fellow of the Institute of Mathematical Statistics
 Elected Fellow of the Society for Modelling and Simulation
 2015 Biennial Medalist of the Modelling and Simulation Society of Australia and New Zealand (MSSANZ)
 2015 Australian Research Council Laureate Fellowship
 2016 Statistical Society of Australia Pitman Medal
 2018 Elected Fellow of the Australian Academy of Science (FAA)
 2018 Elected Fellow of the Academy of the Social Sciences in Australia (FASSA)

References

External links

Kerrie Mengersen Deputy director ACEMS
QUT: Distinguished Professor Kerrie Mengersen
Google Scholar: Kerrie Mengersen

Australian statisticians
Academic staff of Queensland University of Technology
Women statisticians
Fellows of the Institute of Mathematical Statistics
1962 births
University of New England (Australia) alumni
20th-century British women scientists
Living people
Fellows of the Royal Statistical Society
Elected Members of the International Statistical Institute
Fellows of the Australian Academy of Science
20th-century Australian women scientists
21st-century Australian women scientists